Yannis Kondos (1943 – January 2015) was a Greek poet. He read Economics at the University of Piraeus (then Higher School for Industrial Studies). He founded the bookshop Ηνίοχος in 1971, along with Thanassis Niarchos. Since 1975, he has been working for Kedros publishers. He has also been professor of poetry for Kostas Kazakos' School of Dramatic Art.

He belongs to the so-called Genia tou 70, which is a literary term referring to Greek authors who began publishing their work during the 1970s, especially towards the end of the Greek military junta of 1967-1974 and at the first years of the Metapolitefsi.

He was awarded the State Prize for Poetry for his collection, Absurd Athlete in 1998. His work has been translated into English, German and Danish.

Poetry
Περιμετρική (Circular Route), 1970
 (The Chronometer), 1972
 (The Unforeseen), 1975
Φωτοτυπίες (Photocopies), 1977
Danger in the Streets, tr. J. Stathatos (1978) [English translations of selected poems]
 (In the Dialect of the Desert), 1980
 (The Bones), 1982
The Bones: selected poems 1972-1982, tr. J. Stone (1985)
 (By an Anonymous Monk), 1985
 (Gratuitous Darkness), 1989
 (At the Turn of Day), 1992
 (When a Drum is Heard over the City), selection, 1992
 (Absurd Athlete), 1997
 (Pins in the Clouds), 1999
 (The Moon's Hypotenuse), 2002
 (Seconds of Fear), 2006

Prose
 (The Noble Metals), 1994
 (Aristeides, the Little Hippopotamus), for children, 2001
 (Christmas is coming), 2004
 (The Noble Metals II), 2005

References

External links
His entry for the 2001 Frankfurt Book Fair (Greek)
His page at the website of the Hellenic Authors' Society (Greek) and (English)
A blog dedicated to his poetry
His books at Kedros publishers
Audio: Bronze Age by Yannis Kondos (English translation and reading by Peter Constantine)

1943 births
2015 deaths
People from Aigio
Poets from Achaea
20th-century Greek poets
21st-century Greek poets
Greek male poets
20th-century Greek male writers
21st-century Greek male writers